The 1991 Wan Chai District Board election was held on 3 March 1991 to elect all 10 elected members to the 15-member Wan Chai District Board.

Overall election results
Before election:

Change in composition:

Results by constituency

Causeway Bay Central

Happy Valley

Tai Hang and So Kon Po

Wan Chai East

Wan Chai West

See also
 1991 Hong Kong local elections

References

1991 Hong Kong local elections
Wan Chai District Council elections